Susanne Nyström, born 29 December 1982 in Laisvall, Sweden is a Swedish female cross-country skier and nurse.

She competed for Laisvalls SK, having competed for clubs like IFK Mora SK, Arvidsjaur Ski Team] Luleå Gjutarens IF and Piteå Elit.

She won Tjejvasan in 2007, 2008, 2009, 2010, 2012 and 2013. and ended up second ad Tjejvasan 2011. In 2010, she won the women's Vasaloppet main competition, making her the first to win Tjejvasan and the Vasaloppet main competition the same year.

She has also won several Swedish national championship gold medals.

Cross-country skiing results
All results are sourced from the International Ski Federation (FIS).

World Cup

Season standings

References

External links

1982 births
Swedish female cross-country skiers
Vasaloppet winners
Living people
Piteå Elit skiers
21st-century Swedish women